Ghyslaine Salomé Nke Noah (born 8 June 1989), known as Salomé Nke, is a footballer who captains Equatoguinean Primera División femenina club Malabo Kings FC. Mainly a centre back, she can also operate as a right back and a defensive midfielder. Born and raised in Cameroon, she is a naturalized citizen of Equatorial Guinea and plays for that women's national team.

International career
Nke was part of the team at the 2012 African Women's Championship.

International goals
Scores and results list Equatorial Guinea's goal tally first

Honors and awards

Clubs
Estrellas de E'Waiso Ipola
Liga Nacional de Fútbol Femenino: 2018

National team
Equatorial Guinea
Africa Women Cup of Nations: 2008, 2012

References

External links

1989 births
Living people
Footballers from Yaoundé
Cameroonian women's footballers
Women's association football defenders
Cameroonian emigrants to Equatorial Guinea
Naturalized citizens of Equatorial Guinea
Equatoguinean women's footballers
Equatorial Guinea women's international footballers